Joseph Tucker may refer to:
 Joseph Tucker (Massachusetts politician) (1832–1907), lieutenant governor of Massachusetts, 1869–1873
 Joseph John Tucker (1832–1914), Canadian politician
 Joseph Tucker (cricketer) (born 1979), English cricketer
 Joseph H. Tucker (1819–1894), banker, businessman and Illinois militia colonel
 Joe Tucker, British comedy writer
 Joe Tucker (footballer) (1913–1980), Australian rules footballer who played with Geelong
 Joseph Tucker (Royal Navy official) (c. 1760–1838), British surveyor of the Navy